Alberta has provincial legislation allowing its municipalities to conduct municipal censuses. Municipalities choose to conduct their own censuses for multiple reasons such as to better inform municipal service planning and provision or to simply update their populations since the last federal census.

Alberta began the year of 2021 with 345 municipalities, which decreased to 343 with the dissolutions of Improvement District No. 349 on May 1 and the Village of Hythe on July 1. Of these, the only two municipalities to conduct a municipal census in 2021 were the Town of Blackfalds and the Regional Municipality (RM) of Wood Buffalo.

Municipal census results 
The following summarizes the results of the two municipal censuses conducted in 2021.

Breakdowns

Urban and rural service areas

Hamlets 
The following is a list of hamlet populations determined by the 2021 municipal census conducted by the RM of Wood Buffalo, excluding the Fort McMurray urban service area that is presented above.

Shadow population 
Alberta Municipal Affairs defines shadow population as "temporary residents of a municipality who are employed by an industrial or commercial establishment in the municipality for a minimum of 30 days within a municipal census year." The RM of Wood Buffalo conducted a shadow population count in 2021. The following presents the results of this count for comparison with its concurrent municipal census results.

See also 
2021 Alberta municipal elections
List of communities in Alberta

Notes

References

External links 
Alberta Municipal Affairs
Statistics Canada
Statistics Canada: Census Program

Local government in Alberta
Municipal censuses in Alberta
2021 censuses
2021 in Alberta